The Bolaños woodrat (Neotoma palatina) is a species of rodent in the family Cricetidae found only in Mexico.

References

Musser, G. G. and M. D. Carleton. 2005. Superfamily Muroidea. pp. 894–1531 in Mammal Species of the World a Taxonomic and Geographic Reference. D. E. Wilson and D. M. Reeder eds. Johns Hopkins University Press, Baltimore.

Neotoma
Mammals described in 1905
Taxonomy articles created by Polbot